There are over 20,000 Grade II* listed buildings in England. This page is a list of these buildings in the City of London.

Buildings

Churches

|}

Livery company halls

|}

Other

|}

See also
 Grade I listed buildings in the City of London

Notes

External links
 

 
Lists of Grade II* listed buildings in London